Sandra Muente Bayonne (born November 13, 1990) is a Peruvian-Mexican singer. She began her career in the music reality TV show Latin American Idol, where she reached third place. Since then she has appeared in various TV shows in Perú.

References

1990 births
Living people